Hanstruepera is a genus of bacteria from the family of Flavobacteriaceae.

References

Flavobacteria
Bacteria genera
Taxa described in 2015